A bamboo cannon (Jawi: مريام بولوه ; ; , Indonesian: meriam bambu, Javanese: mercon bumbung) is a type of home-made firecracker which is popular during the Hari Raya festive season in Malaysia, and during New Year's Eve celebrations in the Philippines.

Operation 
A typical bamboo cannon consists of a large bamboo node or tube containing some water to which a little calcium carbide is added. The carbide reacts immediately with the water releasing acetylene gas, which has the widest range of explosive limit of any common chemical and a very low ignition energy. A sharp report is produced when a flame is introduced into the bamboo chamber. However, the low density of the acetylene/air mixture is such that the total combustion energy is quite low and weak containers such as bamboo or even glass rarely shatter.  Adding too much carbide does not increase the energy of the explosion but instead weakens it due to high fuel to air ratio. After the shot, fresh air is needed in the tube in order to have another explosion after more carbide is added.

The operating principle also works with other combustible fuels besides acetylene, but since most others have narrower explosive limits, the effect is not as reliable.  Common examples are solvent-containing aerosol consumer products such as spray paint or hairspray.

Less-volatile fuels can also work, with skill, such as 200ml of hot kerosene, poured into a small hole near the breech of the cannon. A lighting stick is used to ignite the fumes and fire the cannon, then fresh air is blown into the small hole and the cannon fired again. The bamboo used for this is usually around 4 to 6 inches in diameter and 4 to 5 feet long.

Indonesia
In Indonesia bamboo cannon is traditional game played by children. It was very popular in the 1990s. Nowadays, it's still played by children in rural areas, where the material (bamboo) is widely available. In West Kalimantan, on the banks of the Kapuas river, there are Bamboo Cannon Festivals, which are celebrated a week before Idul Fitri. The biggest bamboo cannon in Indonesia broke records of Indonesian World Record Museum (MURI) in 2007 and again 2009.

Malaysia
Like other fireworks, bamboo cannons are illegal as stated in Malaysian Explosive Act 1957; more Malay children are turning to the more dangerous bamboo cannon as an alternative to commercial firecrackers which have been banned by the government.

Philippines 
Bamboo cannons in the Philippines are traditionally known as lantaka (after the native naval cannons of the same name), bumbóng ("bamboo tube"), or kanyóng kawayan ("bamboo cannon"). They generally use either calcium carbide (kalburo) or kerosene. They are commonly used as noisemakers in place of or in addition to firecrackers during New Year celebrations. 

Bamboo cannons are legal, and are often touted as a safer alternative to firecrackers. Regardless, they are still dangerous. Bamboo cannons caused the death of one 6-year old boy in Talisay City in 2009 due to lung damage from smoke inhalation.

Boga

The boga or "PVC cannon" is a modern version of the bamboo cannon. A boga is operated in much the same way as a bamboo cannon, but held in the manner of a rocket launcher. Originating in the province of Cavite, use of the device has been banned by the national government since 2006.

The device is made PVC piping of substantial diameter, mated to a toy gun. Denatured alcohol (sometimes paint thinner or acetone) is squirted or sprayed into the pipe's breech end and ignited by the toy gun's trigger mechanism connected to a piezo igniter, or by applying fire. The combination of air and flammable fuel in the pipe's enclosed space when ignited by a spark from the trigger mechanism or by a little fire causes the mixture to combust.

The first prototype was made from segmented tin cans connected with packaging tapes or electrical tapes and cut PET bottles (which is still used) and a later design was made of PVC pipes. Other modifications of boga are introduced such as firing round projectiles which can be used as a weapon and pet bottles as breech end.

In the Philippine city of Kidapawan, North Cotabato, the Kanyóng Kawayan Festival is held from 14-20 December to promote safer noisemaking alternatives during the Christmas season. Empty powdered milk cans are common projectiles used in the city-wide contest held during the event.

A variant form, known as bong-bong, is used by the people of Mangaldan, Pangasinan, but with water and motor oil as the fuel.

The Department of Health has repeatedly warned against use of boga, which they deem to be dangerous as its use carries a risk of blast or burn injury. A ban was ordered on 27 December 2005 against the use of the devices for the impending New Year celebrations. Officials cited a variety of possible injuries from use of the device, mostly involving delayed explosions to the facial region resulting in eye injury, among others. Post-traumatic conjunctivitis was cited as one of the noted effects.

Users of the device mostly are children and teenage boys, who tend to prematurely open the boga whenever it fails to fire, causing any delayed blasts to fire upon the unsuspecting user's face. Of 178 firecracker-related injuries recorded for the 2006 season (as of December 28) so far, eighteen percent were confirmed to have been caused by use of boga. In December 2007, health department officials maintained the ban on the devices, reminding the public with press releases, flyers and awareness campaigns.

Africa
The practice is also present in Africa. In Ghana, they are called Pampuro Tuo and are used during the Christmas and New Year’s holidays. Many African countries, and Africans in the diaspora, including Jamaica and Haiti have similar practices.

Australia
The PVC cannon is a prohibited weapon in the Australian state of New South Wales, along with other devices which are designed to propel or launch a bomb, grenade, rocket or missile by any means other than an explosive.

See also 
 Carbide cannon
 Calcium carbide
 Firecracker
 Eid al-Fitr
 Christmas in the Philippines
 :id:Festival meriam karbit
Potato cannon
Noisemaker

References

External links
Canyon Lata

Cannon
Types of fireworks
Malaysian culture
New Year celebrations
Philippine culture
Indonesian culture